Nayathod or Nayathode is a village near nedumbassery in Ernakulam district in the Indian state of Kerala. It is the birthplace of the Malayalam poet G. Sankara Kurup.

References 

Villages in Ernakulam district